Omid Singh is an Iranian professional footballer of Indian descent. Singh played as a midfielder for Havadar in the Persian Gulf Pro League.

Career
Born in Behbahan, Khuzestan, Iran, Singh began his professional career playing for the Gahar Zagros in 2012–13 Persian Gulf Pro League. He then joined Naft Masjed the following season, and played in the Azadegan League.

In 2016, he joined Esteghlal Khuzestan and won his maiden Persian Gulf Pro League title. He joined Pars Jonoubi Jam the following season and played a pivotal role as Pars Jonoubi Jam won the Azadegan League title for the first time in their history.

On 5 April 2020, it was announced that then I-League side East Bengal FC roped in Singh on a two-year deal, however he has never appeared with the club in any league match. On 14 July 2021, FIFA asked SC East Bengal to pay the salary of Singh after the club refused to pay it. He currently plays for Persian Iranian football club Havadar S.C. in the Persian Gulf Pro League.

Personal life
Singh was born and raised in Khuzestan, Iran. However, his father carries an Indian passport, which makes him eligible to represent the India national team. In 2019, Singh expressed his desire to give up on his Iranian passport and play for India after the national team coach Igor Štimac called him. He also holds the Overseas Citizenship of India card.

Career statistics

Honours

Esteghlal Khuzestan
Persian Gulf Pro League: 2015–16

Pars Jonoubi
Azadegan League: 2016–17

References

External links 

Living people
1991 births
Sportspeople from Khuzestan province
Iranian people of Indian descent
Sportspeople of Indian descent
Iranian footballers
People from Behbahan
Association football wingers
Gahar Zagros players
Naft Masjed Soleyman F.C. players
Esteghlal Ahvaz players
Siah Jamegan players
Esteghlal Khuzestan players
Pars Jonoubi Jam players
Nassaji Mazandaran players
Aluminium Arak players